Rossioglossum insleayi  is an epiphytic species of orchid native to Mexico, where it grows in the humid high oak/pine forests on the Pacific West/  It was first described by Baker in 1840,  and in 1976  was assigned to the genus, Rossioglossum, by Garay and Kennedy.

References

External links

Oncidiinae
Epiphytic orchids
Orchids of Mexico
Orchids of Central America
Plants described in 1840
Taxa named by John Gilbert Baker
Taxa named by John Lindley